Kenneth Thorne (26 January 1924 – 9 July 2014) was a British television and film score composer.

Early life
Thorne was born in Dereham, a town in the English county of Norfolk. Thorne began his musical career as a pianist with the big bands of England during the 1940s, playing at night clubs and the dance halls. At age 27, Thorne decided to seriously study composition with private tutors at Cambridge and later studied the organ for five years in London.

Film scoring
Thorne began composing scores for films in 1948. He was considered Richard Lester's composer of choice since their first work together on It's Trad, Dad! (1962), Help! (1965) and A Funny Thing Happened on the Way to the Forum (1966).

When Henry Mancini was scoring Blake Edwards' 1968 film The Party with Peter Sellers, Thorne composed the soundtrack to Inspector Clouseau. He also composed the music scores for How I Won the War (1967), The Monkees movie Head (1968), The Magic Christian (1969) and The Ritz (1976). He was also hired for Richard Lester's films Superman II and III with instructions to reuse the themes composed by John Williams from the first film and adapt them for the sequels, also adding some original work. From the 1980s, Ken Thorne mainly focused on his work for TV, working predominantly with director Kevin Connor.

His television work included the theme to the 1964 BBC series R3, and he also scored incidental music for The Persuaders! and The Zoo Gang in the 1970s. His later work included the score for the miniseries Return to Lonesome Dove in 1993.

Thorne also had an unexpected chart hit in 1963 when his cover version of Angelo Francesco Lavagnino's "Theme from The Legion's Last Patrol" (Concerto Disperato) reached #4 in the UK charts.

Death
Thorne died at a hospital in West Hills, California on 9 July 2014.

Selected filmography

Three on a Spree (1961)
It's Trad, Dad! (1962)
She Knows Y'Know (1962)
Dead Man's Evidence (1962)
Master Spy (1963)
Help! (1965)
A Funny Thing Happened on the Way to the Forum (1966)
How I Won the War (1967)
Inspector Clouseau (1968)
The Touchables (1968)
Sinful Davey (1969)
The Bed-Sitting Room (1969)
The Magic Christian (1969)
A Talent for Loving (1969)
Hannie Caulder (1971)
Juggernaut (1974)
The Ritz (1976)
Power Play (1978)
Arabian Adventure (1979)
The Outsider (1980)
Superman II (1980)
Wolf Lake (1980)
The Hunchback of Notre Dame (1982)
The House Where Evil Dwells (1982)
Superman III (1983)
Lassiter (1984)
The Evil That Men Do (1984)
Finders Keepers (1984)
The Trouble with Spies (1987)
Sunset Grill (1993)
Mary, Mother of Jesus (1999)
In the Beginning (miniseries) (2000)
Santa Jr. (2002)

Awards and nominations
 Academy Awards
 Winner for Best Music, Scoring of Music, Adaptation or Treatment: A Funny Thing Happened on the Way to the Forum (1966)
 Academy of Science Fiction, Fantasy & Horror Films
 Nominated for Best Music The House Where Evil Dwells (1982)
 Nominated for Best Music Superman II (1980)
 Nominated for Best Music Arabian Adventure (1979)
 Emmy Awards
 Nominated for Outstanding Individual Achievement in Music and Lyrics for "For A Love Like You" from A Season of Hope (1995) [shared with Dennis Spiegel (lyricist)]
 Grammy Awards
 Nominated for Best Original Score Written for a Motion Picture or Television Show for Help! (1965) [shared with John Lennon, Paul McCartney, George Harrison]

References

External links

Ken Thorne at Epdlp 
 Obituary

2014 deaths
1924 births
British film score composers
British male film score composers
British composers
People from Dereham
Best Original Music Score Academy Award winners